Titanbonifica–Benotto, also known as Magniflex–Centroscarpa or Alba Cucine–Benotto, was an Italian professional cycling team that existed from 1986 to 1989.

The team competed in three consecutive editions of the Giro d'Italia and two editions of the Vuelta a España.

Major wins
1987
 Tre Valli Varesine, Franco Ballerini
1989
 Giro dell'Umbria, Stefano Colagè
 Giro di Romagna, Max Sciandri

References

Defunct cycling teams based in Italy
1986 establishments in Italy
1989 disestablishments in Italy
Cycling teams established in 1986
Cycling teams disestablished in 1989